Eukaryotic translation initiation factor 4E-binding protein 2 is a protein that in humans is encoded by the EIF4EBP2 gene.

Animal studies 

EIF4EBP2 knockout mice have been used as an animal model of autism.  Mice without the  Eif4ebp2 gene exhibited autism-like symptoms, including poor social interaction, altered communication and repetitive behaviors.   Knockout mice have high levels of Neuroligins.

Interactions 

EIF4EBP2 has been shown to interact with EIF4E.

References

Further reading